Capital Radio (not to be confused with the later British radio station of the same name) was a pirate radio station which operated from international waters off the coast of the Netherlands in 1970.

The station was set up by Canadian idealist Tim Thomason. In 1965 Thomason had established the International Broadcasting Society with the intention of bringing together professional broadcasting organisations from around the world. Eventually Thomason decided that the Society should have its own radio station which could be used to broadcast messages from the participating organisations.

Thomason and his associates acquired a former German coaster and renamed it the MV King David, because they saw the station as being a David to the major broadcasters' Goliath. The ship was registered in Liechtenstein, becoming unofficially the only member of the tiny, doubly landlocked country's Navy.

Broadcasting history

The ship originally took up position off of Noordwijk on April 25, 1970, but the antenna buckled in a force 8 gale and the ship had to return to port to have the antenna repaired.

Test transmissions finally commenced on May 1 at on frequency 1115 kHz (around 269 metres). These broadcasts consisted of classical music recordings which were alleged to have been appropriated from the BBC World Service by an ex-BBC engineer.

Official programming did not begin until September 1, but after only ten days later that the antenna was damaged again and the ship sailed into Zaandam for service. While it was there the Dutch authorities attempted to impound the ship, the crew illegally sailed the ship back out to sea under cover of darkness.

It was about this time that a serious accident occurred. Third Officer Arie van der Bent's left foot was crushed by the ship's heavy anchor chain while it was being lowered. Van der Bent had to be rushed to hospital on shore. His foot could not be saved and was amputated.

The station returned to the air on October 10 and broadcast uneventfully for a month. On November 10, the ship lost its anchor in a force 12 storms and ran aground at Noordwijk. At that point the ship was impounded over unpaid debts owed to its tendering company. Thomason and the IBS were unable to raise the necessary funds, and so the ship was seized, ending any chance for the station to continue.

Programming

Thomason was not a fan of pop music, so on his orders Capital Radio played alternative forms of music, including country and western, Latin American music, classical music. According to Thomason, this proved popular with listeners.

Antenna design

The ship was fitted with a 10-kilowatt transmitter that had allegedly belonged to Radio 270, and was equipped with an unusual horizontal loop antenna. The reasons for installing this type of antenna were also idealistic as well as technical. All other radio ships employed either vertical mast antennas, or horizontal antennas slung between fore and aft masts. These antenna types produced strong skywaves that could potentially cause interference to distant stations, especially at night. The horizontal loop radiated most of its energy in the form of a surface wave, thereby minimising any unwanted interference.

In practical terms, erecting a horizontal loop antenna on a ship caused several problems. The loop was supported by guy wires from a central mast. It was too wide for the ship to pass through Dutch ship canals, so the side sections had to be hinged so they could be raised to a vertical position until the ship was at sea. The initial design was not strong enough and one of the side sections buckled in strong winds, so the entire loop had to be reinforced and the guy wires strengthened.

Once the station went on air the loop antenna did produce an efficient signal, covering large parts of the Netherlands, Belgium and eastern England although the transmitter was only operated at 1 kilowatt. However, if the ship listed too far in heavy seas one side of the loop could make contact with the water, causing the transmitter to momentarily short out.

External links
 Soundscapes: Tim Thomason interviewed about Capital Radio (Some of the information in this article is derived from this interview)

Offshore radio
Pirate radio stations
Radio stations established in 1970 
Radio_stations_disestablished_in_1970
Defunct radio stations in the Netherlands